Jiang Rong-qiao 姜容樵, 1891-1974 was a famous martial artist from Hebei. His specialized focus in the internal arts led him to develop his own system of Bagua which became recognized and known as Jiang Style Baguazhang.

Biography
In 1926, Jiang Rong-qiao began teaching kung fu in Nanjing. Jiang was instrumental in developing sets that combined Bagua, Xingyi, and Taijiquan. This includes a Tajiquan set known as Taiji Zhang Quan (or Tai Chi Palm and Fist), which is based on sequences from Jiang’s Bagua and Xingyi, as well as the Old Chen-style t'ai chi ch'uan. Some students of Jiang point to these combined forms as a legacy of his teacher, Zhang Zhaodong. The practice of internal style Chinese martial arts (Baguazhang, Xingyiquan and Taijiquan and a variety of minor styles) has been called Neijia kung fu. Because Jiang taught Baguazhang along with Xingyiquan (and taught Taiji Zhang Quan as an advanced form), it is difficult to categorize the practice he taught as anything other than Neijia kung fu.

Jiang had an accident and went blind. Jiang's adopted daughter, Zou Shu-xian, taught classes and helped produce his most famous book, Bagua Palms Practice Method. This was the first Baguazhang book published in China after the 1949 revolution. This book greatly enhanced Jiang's reputation as one of the most famous Chinese Internal style Martial Artists of his generation. Jiang Rong-qiao died at the age of 84. Several of his closest students were: Sha Guo-zhen, Zou Shu-xian, Ji Yuan-song, and Yang Bang-tai.

Jiang Rongqiao's Books
Jiang Rongqiao authored a number of books (Joseph Crandall has translated many of these books into English):

Xingyi Mu Quan (Xingyi Mother Fists);

Baguazhang Lianxifa (Bagua Palms Practice Method);

Xingyi Za Si Chui and Ba Shi Quan;

Xingyi Lianhuan Quan;

Bagua Mysterious Spear;

Qingping Sword;

Tiger Tail Whip.

See also
 Jiang Style Baguazhang
 Baguazhang

References

External links
 Jiang Family Internal Arts Research Institute (Japan) - Master Iiyoku Daigo, successor/godson of Zou Shu-xian

1974 deaths
1891 births
Chinese baguazhang practitioners
Chinese tai chi practitioners
Chinese xingyiquan practitioners
Sportspeople from Hebei
Republic of China writers
Writers from Hebei